In Philippine mythology, the kapre is a creature that may be described as a tree giant, being a tall, dark-coloured, hairy, and muscular creature. Kapres are also said to have a very strong body odour and to sit in tree branches to smoke.

Origins

The term kapre comes from the Arabic kafir (Spanish cafre), meaning a non-believer in Arabic (usually referring to atheists/idolists). The term was later brought to the Philippines by the Spanish who had previous contact with the Moors, they used it to describe the indigenous Negrito ethnic groups with dark skin and features similar to Black Africans. This is also evident in the fact that a synonym for kapre is agtà, another name for the Aeta people. The modern mythical characterizations of the kapre evolved from formerly racially prejudiced portrayals of Negrito tribes by the lowland Christianized ethnic groups of the Philippines during the Spanish period.

The first attestation of the use of the term was caphri, by Antonio Pigafetta of the Magellan expedition. They were described by the people of Suluan to the Magellan crew as dark-skinned, tattooed, and wore barkcloth (except for chieftains who wore a cloth headdress of silk), and had weapons ornamented with gold and large shields.

The term cafre was also used for Papuan slaves brought to the Philippines by the Portuguese before slavery was abolished by Spain.

Natural habitat and attire
Kapres are said to dwell in big trees like acacias, mangoes, bamboo, and banyan (known in the Philippines as balete). It is also mostly seen sitting under those trees. The Kapre is said to wear the indigenous Northern Philippine loincloth known as bahag, and according to some, often wears a belt which gives the kapre the ability to be invisible to humans. In some versions, the kapre is supposed to hold a magical white stone, a little smaller in size than a quail egg. Should any person happen to obtain this stone, the kapre can grant wishes.

Behavior
Kapres are believed to be nocturnal and omnivorous. They are not necessarily considered to be evil. However, they may turn vengeful when the tree that they are inhabiting is cut down.

A Kapre may make contact with people to offer friendship, or if it is attracted to a woman. If a Kapre befriends a human, especially because of love, the Kapre will consistently follow its "love interest" throughout life. Also, if one is a friend of the Kapre, then that person will have the ability to see it and if they were to sit on it then any other person would be able to see the huge entity.

Kapres, also called agtà, are said to play pranks on people, frequently making travelers become disoriented and lose their way in the mountains or in the woods. They are also believed to have the ability to confuse people even in their own familiar surroundings; for instance, someone who forgets that they are in their own garden or home is said to have been tricked by a Kapre. Reports of experiencing Kapre enchantment include that of witnessing rustling tree branches, even if the wind is not strong. Some more examples would be hearing loud laughter coming from an unseen being, witnessing much smoke from the top of a tree, seeing big red glaring eyes during night time from a tree, as well as actually seeing a Kapre walking in forested areas. It is also believed that abundant fireflies in woody areas are the embers from the Kapre's lit cigars or tobacco pipe. There might be Aztec influence there too since cigars and tobacco are a Native-American invention.

Documentary
In the 2015 documentary series The Creatures of Philippine Mythology, the origin, history and evolution of the Kapre is examined. It starts in the pre-Spanish Philippines where animist beliefs created a huge black spirit that watched people from the trees, follows the etymology of the term "kapre", and discovers why the creature is always smoking cigars.

See also

 Aswang
 Manananggal
 Ghosts in Filipino culture
 Tikbalang
 Nephilim
 Troll

Further reading

References

External links
 Filipino Folklore: Kapre

Mythic humanoids
Mythological human hybrids
Philippine demons
Trees in mythology
Giants
Philippine mythology
Philippine legendary creatures